Aleš Dryml may refer to:
Aleš Dryml Sr., former Czechoslovakian speedway rider for Sheffield Tigers
Aleš Dryml Jr., his son, Czech speedway rider